The 1983 European Cup final was a football match held at the Olympic Stadium, Athens, on 25 May 1983, that saw Hamburg of West Germany defeat Juventus of Italy 1–0. A single goal from Felix Magath eight minutes into the game was enough for Hamburg to claim their first European Cup title. It was the sixth consecutive European Cup final to finish with a 1–0 scoreline.

Route to the final

Match

Details

See also
1982–83 European Cup
Blocco-Juve
Juventus F.C. in European football

References

External links
1982–83 season at UEFA.com

1
Hamburger SV matches
Juventus F.C. matches
International club association football competitions hosted by Greece
1983
1982–83 in German football
1982–83 in Italian football
May 1983 sports events in Europe
1980s in Athens
Sports competitions in Athens